Eduardo Mendoza Garriga (born 11 January 1943 in Barcelona, Spain) is a Spanish novelist.

Early life
He studied law in the first half of the 1960s and lived in New York City between 1973 and 1982, working as interpreter for the United Nations, and then tried to become a lawyer and then he realized that he wanted to be a writer. He maintained an intense relationship with novelists Juan Benet and Juan García Hortelano, poet Pere Gimferrer and writer (and neighbour) Félix de Azúa. He currently lives in London.

Writing career
In 1975 he published his very successful first novel, La Verdad sobre el Caso Savolta (The Truth About the Savolta Case), where he shows his ability to use different resources and styles. The novel is considered a precursor to the social change in the Spanish post-Franco society and the first novel of the transition to democracy. He describes the union fights at the beginning of the 20th century, showing the social, cultural and economic conditions of workers in Barcelona by that time. A year later he was awarded the Critics Prize. His most acclaimed novel is probably La Ciudad de los Prodigios (The City of Marvels, 1986), about the social and urban evolution of Barcelona between the Universal Expositions of 1888 and 1929. It was film adapted by Mario Camus in 1999. In 1992, he published the novel, El Año del Diluvio (The Year of the Flood), which tells of the inner conflicts faced by Sister Consuelo after she meets and falls in love with Augusto Aixelâ, with very evocative descriptions of the post-civil war prevailing deprivations in Spain by that time. In 1996, he published his third major Barcelona-related novel, this time set in the 1940s, Una Comedia Ligera (A Light Comedy).

Also within Mendoza's work stands the saga of the mad detective, a peculiar character, a nameless accidental-detective locked up in a mental hospital. The first of these novels, El Misterio de la Cripta Embrujada (The Mystery of the Enchanted Crypt, 1979) is a parody with hilarious moments mixing hard-boiled genre with Gothic narrative. In the second novel of the saga, El Laberinto de las Aceitunas (The Olive Labyrinth, 1982), Mendoza confirms his talent as parodist; the novel stands as one of his most successful works. The third novel of the saga, La Aventura del Tocador de Señoras (The Adventure of the Ladies' Dressing Table), and the fourth one, El Enredo de la Bolsa y la Vida (The Money and the Life Muddle), were published in 2001 and 2012, respectively. The 5th novel was released in 2015 under the title of El Secreto de la Modelo Extraviada (The Secret of the Missing Model) with great success.

The Spanish newspaper El País published two of his novels in instalments, Sin Noticias de Gurb (No Word from Gurb, 1990) and El Último Trayecto de Horacio Dos (The Last Journey of Horatio Dos, 2001), both of them science fiction comedy novels.

In 1993 appeared his first play, Restauració (Restoration), written in Catalan and later translated into Spanish by Mendoza himself. This first theatrical piece was followed by two other titles that the three of them were published together in 2017.

In October 2010, he won the literary award Premio Planeta for his novel Riña de Gatos. Madrid, 1936 (An Englishman in Madrid). In December 2013, he won the European Book Prize (fiction) also for An Englishman in Madrid. Later on, in June 2015, he received the Franz Kafka Prize, the first Spanish writer to win it. In 2016 he was awarded the Premio Cervantes, the current most prestigious prize for Spanish-written literature. 2018 saw the launch of the novel El Rey Recibe (The King Receives), the first book in the Three Laws of Motion trilogy, which explores the major developments of the second half of the 20th century.

Eduardo Mendoza's narrative studies divides his work into serious or major novels, and humorous or minor ones, although recent studies have shown the seriousness, criticism and transcendence in his parodic novels, as well as the humor present in his serious ones, due to the influence of the characteristics of the postmodern novel.

Eduardo Mendoza is considered among the most important Spanish living writers, alongside novelists like Arturo Pérez-Reverte and Andrés Pascual, all of them included in the so-called Spanish New Narrative.

Bibliography

Novels
 1975: La verdad sobre el caso Savolta
 1979: El misterio de la cripta embrujada  (1st novel from the nameless detective series)
 1982: El laberinto de las aceitunas  (2nd from the nameless detective series)
 1986: La ciudad de los prodigios
 1989: La isla inaudita
 1990: Sin noticias de Gurb (published in instalments by El País)
 1992: El año del diluvio
 1996: Una comedia ligera
 2001: La aventura del tocador de señoras  (3rd novel from the nameless detective series)
 2002: El último trayecto de Horacio Dos (published in instalments by El País)
 2006: Mauricio o las elecciones primarias
 2008: El asombroso viaje de Pomponio Flato
 2010: Riña de gatos. Madrid 1936 (Premio Planeta)
 2012: El enredo de la bolsa y la vida  (4th novel from the nameless detective series)
 2015: El secreto de la modelo extraviada  (5th novel from the nameless detective series)
 2018: El rey recibe

Short stories
 2009: Tres vidas de santos (La ballena, El final de Dubslav and El malentendido)
 2011: El camino del cole (children's book)

Theatre
 1993: Restauración
 2000: Gloria: Comedia en un acto
 2004: Grandes preguntas
 2017: Teatro reunido (Restauración, Gloria and Grandes cosas)

Essays
 1986: Nueva York
 1989: Barcelona modernista  (co-written with his sister Cristina)
 2001: Baroja, la contradicción (biographic essay)
 2007: ¿Quién se acuerda de Armando Palacio Valdés?
 2017: Las barbas del profeta
 2017: ¿Que está pasando en Cataluña?

References

External links

Lecturalia / Eduardo Mendoza

1943 births
Living people
Writers from Barcelona
Spanish novelists
Spanish male novelists
Spanish translators
United Nations interpreters
20th-century Spanish novelists
21st-century Spanish novelists
20th-century Spanish male writers
21st-century Spanish male writers
Spanish officials of the United Nations
Premio Cervantes winners